The Lincoln Blackwood is a luxury pickup truck that was marketed by the Lincoln division of Ford Motor Company for the 2002 model year.  The first pickup truck marketed by Lincoln, the Blackwood was derived from the Ford F-150 SuperCrew and the Lincoln Navigator.  Drawing its name from its simulated black woodgrain cargo box, the Blackwood was offered solely with a black-painted exterior.

Marketed in the United States and Mexico, the Blackwood fell far under sales projections.  After the 2002 model year, the Blackwood was discontinued in the United States, with a short run of 2003 models produced for Mexico.  In total, only 3,356 units were produced, making it both the rarest and shortest-produced Lincoln model line.  For 2006, Lincoln entered the pickup truck segment for a second time with the Lincoln Mark LT, again based on the Ford F-150.

The first Lincoln vehicle manufactured exclusively outside of the state of Michigan since 1958, the Blackwood was assembled by Ford at its Kansas City Assembly facility in Claycomo, Missouri, alongside the F-150 from August 2001 to December 2002.

Background 
The 1998 launch of the Lincoln Navigator was met with success; along with becoming the second best-selling Lincoln (behind the Town Car), the Navigator contributed to Lincoln overtaking Cadillac in sales for the first time.  To build on its success in the light-truck segment, a Lincoln Blackwood concept vehicle was introduced at the 1999 North American International Auto Show; it was also displayed at the 1999 LA Auto Show.

Named the "ultimate utility vehicle" by Ford, the Blackwood was intended to combine the utility of a truck-based vehicle (such as the Navigator or an F-150) with the comfort of a sedan (such as the Town Car), replacing the F-Series pickup bed with an enclosed cargo area bodied with black African wenge wood (adopting a styling element of wood-bodied station wagons).  To protect the wood from the elements, it was sealed with epoxy and inlaid with aluminum stripes.

Production development 
Met with nearly universal approval by the public, the Blackwood concept vehicle was approved for production shortly after its display; it was also displayed by Ford at the 1999 Frankfurt Auto Show (a rare appearance of Lincoln vehicles in Europe).

Following its approval for production, the Lincoln Blackwood saw few almost no changes made from the 1999 concept vehicle.  For a lower ride height and larger tire sidewall, the 19-inch wheels were downsized to 18 inches.  To produce the cargo bed at a realistic cost, the 20 square feet of expensive wood was replaced by screened laminate composite panels (the inlaid aluminum strakes remained).

Intended to enter production in early 2001, sales of the Blackwood were delayed several months by supply problems related to the cargo box (produced by Magna Steyr).  At the end of 2001, Ford froze their contracts with parent company Magna International in response to the issue.

At the time of its launch, Lincoln was unsure of how many examples of the Blackwood would be produced.  Intending to limit yearly production (to maintain exclusivity), Lincoln did plan to sell at least 18,000 vehicles over multiple years.

Model overview

Chassis 
The Lincoln Blackwood uses the chassis of the tenth-generation F-Series (introduced by the 1997 F-150), using a 138.5-inch wheelbase.  The Blackwood shared its front short-long control arm independent front suspension with the F-150; while retaining the solid rear axle, the rear suspension was also fitted with air springs (closer in line with the Lincoln Town Car).

In contrast to the Lincoln Navigator, all Blackwoods were manufactured with rear-wheel drive (to maintain a lower ride height).  The model line had a 1200-lb payload with an 8700-lb towing capacity.

Powertrain details 
Shared with the Navigator, the Blackwood is fitted with a 5.4L V8, producing 300 hp.  In place of the SOHC 16-valve Triton V8 used by the F-150, the Blackwood used the DOHC 32-valve InTech V8 used by Lincoln; the engine was paired to a 4-speed automatic transmission.

Body design

Exterior 

Sharing its cab with the Ford F-150 SuperCrew, the Blackwood sources its front bodywork directly from the Navigator.  In contrast to its Ford counterpart, the 4-foot 8-inch cargo bed of the Blackwood was constructed of plastic composites.  In its namesake design feature, the exterior of the cargo bed was styled with imitation black African wengewood with aluminum-strake inlays (making it the first "woodie" Ford Motor Company vehicle since the LTD Country Squire and Colony Park station wagons, discontinued in 1991).

In another major design change, the rear cargo bed was repurposed as a watertight trunk, adopting a permanently-mounted tonneau cover (power-operated), opening above a 50/50 hinged door (replacing a tailgate).  The interior of the Blackwood cargo area was fully carpeted, lined in polished aluminum, and lit with LED lighting.  While far smaller in interior size than a similar-length F-150 cargo bed, at 26 cubic feet, the cargo area of the Blackwood was larger than the trunk of the Lincoln Town Car (itself, the highest-capacity sedan produced at the time).

Interior 
Sourced almost directly from the first-generation Lincoln Navigator, the interior of the Blackwood shares primarily its dashboard with the F-150 (as does the Expedition and Navigator), using imitation black oak wood for interior trim.  The model line uses a four-seat 2+2 seating configuration (effectively the front two rows of the Navigator interior), placing a large center console between the two rear seats.  All four seats were upholstered in Connolly leather, with heating and cooling for the front seats.

Trim 
In line with the first-generation Navigator, Lincoln offered the Blackwood under a single trim level.  The model line was equipped with nearly every available Lincoln feature standard, including a sunroof, premium sound system (cassette player in dashboard with CD changer in front console), and multi-zone automatic climate control.

Only one option was offered for the Blackwood: a vehicle telematics system, which added a voice-activated cellular phone and a GPS navigation system (mounted on a 5-inch front-console screen).  Along with standard dual front airbags, the Blackwood was fitted with standard front side airbags.

Neiman Marcus Edition

For the 2001 Neiman Marcus spring catalog, Lincoln built a special edition of 50 Neiman Marcus Edition Blackwoods.  While sharing the same exterior as a standard Blackwood, several upgrades were made to the interior, including Neiman Marcus logo-embroidered headrests and a modified rear console, including a 7-inch widescreen LCD Panasonic DVD player with wireless headphones; the console also received a cooler/warmer compartment.

While priced at $58,800 ($6,300 higher than a regular Blackwood), the Neiman Marcus Edition Blackwood sold out within less than 24 hours of its release.

Discontinuation 
After the 2002 model year, Lincoln ended sales of the Blackwood in the United States, with all 2003 production of the model line sold in Mexico; the final Lincoln Blackwood rolled off the assembly line in December 2002, 15 months after its entry into production.

Introduced alongside the Blackwood for 2002, the Cadillac Escalade EXT outsold the model line more than four-to-one.  While also sold as a crew-cab pickup truck from an American luxury brand, the Escalade EXT was available with multiple features favored by buyers, including optional four-wheel drive, an open-roof cargo area, and multiple colors.  Based on the Chevrolet Avalanche, the Escalade EXT had a reconfigurable interior with five-passenger seating.

Epilogue 
For 2006, Lincoln reentered the pickup truck segment with Lincoln Mark LT. Again, based on the Ford F-150, the Mark LT abandoned many of the model-unique features of the Blackwood in favor of gaining the functionality of a pickup truck.  While massively outsold by its Ford counterpart, the Mark LT proved more successful than its predecessor, nearly matching the Escalade EXT in sales.

After the 2008 model year, Ford ended sales of the Mark LT in United States, effectively replaced by the Platinum and Limited trims, added to both the F-150 and Super Duty versions of the F-Series.  While Cadillac ended sales of the Escalade EXT pickup after 2013, GM continued production of luxury-oriented pickups through its GMC "Denali" sub-brand. In 2018, the Ford F-450 Super Duty Limited became the first factory-produced pickup truck with a price of over $100,000.

References

External links

Blackwood
Pickup trucks
Rear-wheel-drive vehicles
Cars introduced in 2001